Lambis scorpius, common name the scorpion conch or scorpion spider conch, is a species of large sea snail, a marine gastropod mollusk in the family Strombidae, the true conchs.
Subspecies
 Lambis scorpius indomaris Abbott, 1961

Description

The size of an adult shell varies between 95 mm and 220 mm.

Distribution
This species occurs in the Indian Ocean off Chagos, Madagascar and  Tanzania; in the Western Pacific and off the Philippines.

References

 Dautzenberg, Ph. (1929). Mollusques testacés marins de Madagascar. Faune des Colonies Francaises, Tome III
 Spry, J.F. (1961). The sea shells of Dar es Salaam: Gastropods. Tanganyika Notes and Records 56
 Walls, J.G. (1980). Conchs, tibias and harps. A survey of the molluscan families Strombidae and Harpidae. T.F.H. Publications Ltd, Hong Kong.
 Liu, J.Y. [Ruiyu] (ed.). (2008). Checklist of marine biota of China seas. China Science Press. 1267 pp
 Liverani V. (2014) The superfamily Stromboidea. Addenda and corrigenda. In: G.T. Poppe, K. Groh & C. Renker (eds), A conchological iconography. pp. 1-54, pls 131-164. Harxheim: Conchbooks.

External links 
 
  Linnaeus, C. (1758). Systema Naturae per regna tria naturae, secundum classes, ordines, genera, species, cum characteribus, differentiis, synonymis, locis. Editio decima, reformata [10th revised edition, vol. 1: 824 pp. Laurentius Salvius: Holmiae]

Strombidae
Gastropods described in 1758
Taxa named by Carl Linnaeus